The Pymble Substation is a heritage-listed electrical substation at 982-984 Pacific Highway, in the Sydney suburb of Pymble, in the Ku-ring-gai Council local government area of New South Wales, Australia. It was built from 1926 to 1928. It is also known as #195 Pymble 33KV Zone/Depot. The property is owned by Ausgrid, an agency of the Government of New South Wales. It was added to the New South Wales State Heritage Register on 2 April 1999.

History 
The Pymble Zone substation/depot is a purpose designed and built structure dating from 1928. "Substation No. 195, 1928" is written on the lintel pediments in relief.
Historical period - 1926-1950

Description 

The Pymble Zone substation/depot is a large and elegant parapetted one and two storey structure with roofs of varing heights, round headed windows, and contrasting lintel pediments. It is a refined example of the Interwar Stripped Classical style as evidenced by the vertical emphasis, vestigial classical cornice and groupings of multi-paned windows. Stylistic elements also include recessed panels incorporating corbelled brickwork near the base and parapet levels, and decorative elements including contrasting brickwork and cement rendered lintel pediments.

Two large entrances with roller shutters provide access. The Pymble Zone substation/depot is constructed in load-bearing face brick with externally expressed engaged piers. The windows make use of brick arch construction.

The sustain is completed in the Interwar Stripped Classical architectural style. Exterior materials used include face brick, cement render, and steel roller shutter.

Condition 
As at 8 November 2000, the substation condition was good.

Heritage listing 
As at 21 October 1998, the Pymble Zone substation/depot is an elegant and refined example of a well detailed face brick substation building designed in the Interwar period. It is considered to be of State significance and a rare and representative example of this style of substation building.

Substation was listed on the New South Wales State Heritage Register on 2 April 1999.

See also 

Australian non-residential architectural styles
Ausgrid

References

Attribution

External links

New South Wales State Heritage Register
Pymble, New South Wales
Electric power infrastructure in New South Wales
Articles incorporating text from the New South Wales State Heritage Register
1928 establishments in Australia
Energy infrastructure completed in 1928
Buildings and structures completed in 1928